The 1993 Dutch Supercup, known as the PTT Telecom Cup for sponsorship reasons, was the fourth Supercup match in Dutch football. The game was held on 8 August 1993 at De Kuip in Rotterdam. The match was played between 1992–93 Eredivisie winners Feyenoord, and 1992–93 KNVB Cup winners Ajax. The game ended with a 4–0 victory for Ajax.

Match

1993
Supercup
D
D
Dutch Supercup